Coppinsidea is a genus of two species of crustose lichens in the family Ramalinaceae. It was circumscribed in 2019 by lichenologists Sergey Kondratyuk, Edit Farkas, and Laszlo Lőkös with Coppinsidea sphaerella designated as the type species. Species of Coppinsidea are similar in appearance and morphology to Thamnolecania, but differ from them in having a thallus that is crustose (rather than fruticose, mostly convex to almost spherical apothecia that are lecideine or biatorine in structure, as well as in being distributed in the Northern Hemisphere.

The genus is named to honour British lichenologist Brian J. Coppins.

Species
Coppinsidea sphaerella 
Coppinsidea vainioana 

Several species included in the original circumscription of the genus have since been moved to other genera:
Coppinsidea alba  (Biatora veteranorum)
Coppinsidea aphana  (Catillaria aphana)
Coppinsidea croatica  (Lecania croatica)
Coppinsidea fuscoviridis  (Bacidia fuscoviridis)
Coppinsidea pallens  (Biatora pallens)
Coppinsidea ropalosporoides  (Gyalidea ropalosporoides)
Coppinsidea scotinodes  (Catillaria scotinodes)

References

Ramalinaceae
Lecanorales genera
Lichen genera
Taxa described in 2019
Taxa named by Sergey Kondratyuk